The 2017–18 Nedbank Cup is a South African club football (soccer) tournament. The knockout tournament, based on the English FA Cup format, was one of a weak opponent facing a stronger one.

Qualifying round

Round of 32

Round of 16

Quarterfinals

Semi-finals

Final

External links
Nedbank Cup Official Website

Notes and references

2017–18 domestic association football cups
2017–18 in South African soccer
2017-18